Kokui Selormey Hanson, also known Kokui Selormey (born 4 November 1978) is a Ghanaian media personality, presenter, broadcast journalist, producer, event host, singer and entrepreneur.

Early life and education 
Kokui is the daughter of former statesman Victor Selormey. She completed her basic education at Ridge Church School and had her secondary education at Holy Child Senior High School, Cape Coast. She undertook programs at the Allen Academy, Texas, prior to studying Music and Theatre in Spelman College, Atlanta and later advanced to the New England Conservatory of Music (NEC), Boston for a master's degree.

Career 
Kokui worked in 2009, with the Ghana Civil Service. She later moved into the media space, with Citi FM, as a co-host on The Citi Breakfast Show and host of Classic Citi then, as co-host and content producer on Viasat 1's program, This Morning (2012-2016), with Patrice Amegashie. She was also the initial presenter for Healthline, a TV program sponsored by Vodafone Ghana. Kokui was the host and producer for Head Start on Kwesé TV. She also hosted other programs (Home Run and Final Whistle) on the same network.

As a singer, Kokui has performed on the Nubian Noel, an album of popular Christmas songs with legendary South African musician Hugh Masekela. She envisions embarking on a musical project with a mix of African traditional music and her singing style.

In 2014, she was appointed as an ambassador for Philips Avent's 30th Anniversary Celebration in Ghana. Kokui is a brand influencer for Vlisco in Ghana and has been a parent ambassador for SKY Girls Ghana from 2017. She launched her fashion brand in 2018.

Kokui hosted the first Ghana Virtual Career Fair in July 2020, organised by the Ghanaian-German Centre for Jobs, Migration and Reintegration (GGC), in cooperation with the Delegation of German Industry and Commerce in Ghana (AHK Ghana) and the Ministry of Employment and Labour Relations, with funding from the German Development Cooperation.

She rejoins the Citi FM morning show The Citi Breakfast Show team, consisting of Bernard Avle, Kojo Akoto Boateng, Nathan Quao and Godfred Akoto Boafo.

Personal life 
In 2011, Kokui wedded Kobbi Hanson, with whom she now has four children. The broadcast journalist featured in a hospital drama series titled ‘Accra Medic.’

Awards 
Kokui won the 2016 Television Female Presenter of the Year and the 2016 Television Morning Show Host of the Year, at the 2016 Radio and Television Personality Awards.

Discography 

 Afropopera Anthology Vol 1: Negro Spirituals [released on June 6, 2022] 

Kokui and her group of Ghanaian musicians created the 'Afropopera Anthology Vol 1: Negro Spirituals' which is their first musical project. The group comprises Kokui Selormey Hanson (soprano, lead vocalist), Michael Dodoo (keyboardist, music director), Emmanuel ‘Fiifi Flawless’ Quayson (violin), Edmund Abrokwah (trumpet, saxophone), Joshua Bortey (drums) and Cornelius Manor (bass guitar).

References

Ghanaian journalists
1978 births
Living people
Ridge Church School alumni